The Cup of Fury is a 1920 American silent drama film directed by T. Hayes Hunter and starring Helene Chadwick, Rockliffe Fellowes, and Frank Leigh.

Plot
As described in a film magazine, Davidge (Fellowes), while on business in London for the United States government, attends a dinner given by wealthy Germans, Sir Joseph Webling (Standing) and his wife Lady Webling (Lester). He meets their adopted daughter Marie (Chadwick) and recalls having seen her before in America, where she was billed as "Mamsie" in a vaudeville act. That evening Scotland Yard's secret service men raid the Weblings and their daughter, whereupon she confesses that she is an American and is allowed to return to the United States. The Weblings take poison and die before the detectives can prevent it. Mamsie obtains employment in a ship builder's office under Davidge. The secret launching of a ship is innocently disclosed by Mamsie to her brother-in-law, a confessed member of the Industrial Workers of the World, who in turn advises a German spy. The ship is destroyed off Cape Charles by a German U-boat. Mamsie then proposes to run down the criminals and, while employed as a "passer boy," unearths a scheme to blow up the dockyards. She notifies Davidge and he comes to her assistance, throws the criminals into the ocean, and saves the dockyards.

Cast

References

Bibliography
 Goble, Alan. The Complete Index to Literary Sources in Film. Walter de Gruyter, 1999.

External links

 
 Film still at silentfilmstillarchive.com

1920 films
1920 drama films
1920s English-language films
American silent feature films
Silent American drama films
Films based on American novels
Films based on works by Rupert Hughes
Films directed by T. Hayes Hunter
American black-and-white films
1920s American films
Films with screenplays by Richard Schayer
Films set in London